Johann Graf (born 3 January 1946) is an Austrian billionaire businessman, the founder and owner of Novomatic, an Austrian gambling company.

Early life
Graf was born in Austria on January 3, 1946. He lived with his parents in Vienna and was a butcher in his early career.

Personal life
Graf is divorced with three children and lives in Vienna. He collects vintage cars and owns some 120, most of which are Jaguars.

According to Forbes’ list of global billionaires, he is listed at number 140 with a net worth of $10.3 billion as of June 2019.

References 

1946 births
Living people
Austrian businesspeople
Austrian billionaires
Car collectors